Pingüino de Humboldt National Reserve is a nature reserve located a short distance off the coast of mainland Chile. It consists of three islands: Chañaral, Damas and Choros. Coastal communities of Caleta Chañaral, Chañaral de Aceituno, Punta de Choros are  nearby. The reserve is an important breeding site for the Humboldt penguin, for which it is named, and is a habitat for sea lions and bottlenose dolphins, chungungos (marine otters), sea turtle, whale, albatross and cormorant. Aside from dolphins, local cetacean diversity includes migratory rorquals such as blue, fin, and humpback whales, and sperm whales.

The park is located in both Region III and Region IV of Chile. The reserve includes the Aceituno de Chañaral Island (third region) and Damas and Choros Islands (fourth region).

It is part of the Sistema Nacional de Áreas Silvestres Protegidas del Estado de Chile (National System of Protected Areas of the State of Chile), administered by the Corporación Nacional Forestal (National Forest Service, Conaf).

Access routes
From La Serena, Chile advance on the road 75 km. to the turnoff leading to the village of Los Choros. From here, walk 45 km. by dirt road, which in its last 5 km. going through a difficult transition dune.

Registration
National Forestry Corporation (CONAF) registration is required at Punta de Choros. The next step is to hire one of the boats going out to the reserve's main attractions, Isla Damas, Isla Choros and Isla Chañaral.

Choros Island
In 2013, the Chilean National Forestry Corporation (CONAF), in collaboration with Island Conservation, removed invasive rabbits from Choros Island benefiting the Humboldt penguin, Peruvian diving petrel, and the local eco-tourism industry. Since 2014, the return of fields of Alstroemeria philippii and the increase in Peruvian diving petrels seeking out burrows signaled a return to ecological health. In 2018, the partners declared the removal of invasive rabbits from the Humboldt Penguin National Reserve a success.

Damas Island
Damas Island measures 60.3 hectares and much of its charm lies in its Caribbean style beaches. However, the water is fairly cold due to the Humboldt current.

Damas Island is the only place that has camping and picnicking facilities and to get there you have to contract the services of fishermen in the vicinity of Punta de Choros cove.

Climate
The climate is considered semiarid because it is arid by the north and mild by the south. The shore temperatures are homogeneous, meanwhile in the interior the temperature oscillates between day and night time. Rain during winter season.

Admission
Entrance is $1600 Chilean pesos for adults, and $600 Chilean pesos for kids.

References

External links 

 Pingüino de Humboldt National Reserve page at Conaf
 360° panoramas of Damas and Choros islands (Requires QuickTimePlayer)
 
 
 Scientific Study on the Humboldt Penguins|Scientific Study on the Humboldt Penguins
 

National reserves of Chile
Protected areas of Atacama Region
Protected areas of Coquimbo Region
Coasts of Atacama Region
Coasts of Coquimbo Region
Island restoration